The 2014 UEC European Track Championships was the fifth edition of the elite UEC European Track Championships in track cycling and took place at the Vélodrome Amédée Détraux in Baie-Mahault, Guadeloupe, France, between 16 and 19 October. The Event was organised by the European Cycling Union. All European champions are awarded the UEC European Champion jersey which may be worn by the champion throughout the year when competing in the same event at other competitions.

The programme for the 2014 championships was considerably extended, and all World Championship track events were held; ten Olympic events, (sprint, team sprint, keirin, team pursuit and omnium, for both men and women), for which qualification points for the 2016 Summer Olympics were available for the first time, and nine non-Olympic events; the men's madison race and points races, scratch races, sprint time trials (1000 metres for men, 500 metres for women) and individual pursuits for both genders were held as part of the championships. The omnium was held in its new format for the first time, ending with the points race, rather than the sprint time trial.

Unusually, the event was held on a fully outdoor concrete track with a 333-metre circumference, as opposed to the now standard 250 metre indoor wooden velodromes normally used in such events. As a result, several of the events (team sprints, omniums and points races) will be held over non-standard distances.

In addition, the event took place outside continental Europe for the first time, being held in the French caribbean province department of Guadeloupe.

Summary

Great Britain topped the medal table with six golds, including a clean sweep of team and individual pursuit titles. Germany won the most medals, with thirteen including a fifth successive men's team sprint title, while Russia were second on golds, with four, and medals with eleven. There was a first ever medal for Austria, gold in the men's madison.

The most successful individual was Russia's Anastasiia Voinova with three gold medals.

The redesigned omnium event, where all points won in the first five events go forward into the final points race, was held in its new format for the first time. Despite the change, Laura Trott of Great Britain defended her title in the women's edition to retain her claim as most successful cyclist in the history of the event with six golds. 2013 points race winner, Elia Viviani of Italy won the men's event, having entered the final points race already with a clear lead. Katie Archibald became the first winner of the women's individual pursuit at the championships. In doing so she ended British team-mate Joanna Rowsell's monopoly on all available major international team and individual pursuit titles.

Ed Clancy's team pursuit gold made him the most successful male rider in the events history with five gold medals and one bronze medal in total. Grégory Baugé's sprint gold was his first, and was won on home soil, as Bauge was born in Guadeloupe.

Events were delayed on a number of occasions by rain on the outdoor track, and times in the timed events were, as expected, significantly slower than usual.

Participating nations
218 cyclists (93 women, 125 men) from 23 nations participated at the championships. The number of cyclists per nation is shown in parentheses.

  (2)
  (4)
  (details) (14)
  (10)
  (6)
  (6)
  (3)
  (19) (host)
  (17)
  (5)
  (details) (15)
  (1)
  (11)
  (12)
  (9)
  (details) (11)
  (14)
  (22)
  (1)
  (7)
  (15)
  (1)
  (13)

Events

§ = raced over non-standard distance (men=1000 metres, women=660 metres)
 shaded events are non-Olympic
 riders named in italics did not contest the corresponding finals

Medal table

References

External links

European Cycling Union

 
European Track Championships
European Track Championships
UEC European Track Championships
European Track Championships
International cycle races hosted by France
International sports competitions hosted by Guadeloupe
UEC European Track Championships